Kelley Township is an inactive township in Ripley County, in the U.S. state of Missouri.

Kelley Township was erected in 1871, and named after the local Kelley family.

References

Townships in Missouri
Townships in Ripley County, Missouri